Paul O. Carrese (kuh-REES) is Director of the School of Civic & Economic Thought and Leadership at Arizona State University.  For nearly two decades he was a professor of political science at the United States Air Force Academy.  He is author of the book The Cloaking of Power: Montesquieu, Blackstone, and the Rise of Judicial Activism  and co-editor of three other books. His most recent book is Democracy in Moderation: Montesquieu, Tocqueville, and Sustainable Liberalism (Cambridge University Press, 2016). He has held fellowships at Harvard University; the University of Delhi (as a Fulbright fellow); and the James Madison Program, Politics Department, Princeton University.  As of January 2017, he became the first Director of the School of Civic & Economic Thought and Leadership at Arizona State University in Tempe, an interdisciplinary great-books program that aims to prepare leaders for American civil society and statesman-like leaders for public service.

Education
Carrese graduated from Middlebury College in Vermont with a B.A. in political science in 1989, where he studied with Murray Dry and Paul Nelson, before attending Oxford University on a Rhodes Scholarship. At Oxford's Pembroke College, he earned two master's degrees, one in politics and philosophy in 1991 and one in theology in 1993. He received his Ph.D. in political science from Boston College in 1998.

Career
From 1993 to 1995, Carrese was a teaching assistant at Boston College, and he taught at Middlebury from 1996 to 1998. After receiving his Ph.D., Carrese took a job at the Air Force Academy in Colorado Springs as an assistant professor of political science. In 2000, he became an associate professor, and in 2003 a full professor. He was the co-founder of the Academy's great-books honors program, the Scholars Program, and served as its second Director.  He was awarded a post-doctoral fellowship in the Government Department of Harvard University, 2000-2001; a Fulbright fellowship at University of Delhi in New Delhi, 2007-2008; and a research fellowship in the James Madison Program on American Ideals and Institutions, Politics Department, Princeton University in 2012-13. Carrese teaches several political science and social science courses at the Academy.

References

External links
 bio at USAF Academy Political Science page
 Democracy in Moderation, 2016

American Rhodes Scholars
American educators
Morrissey College of Arts & Sciences alumni
Harvard University staff
Living people
Middlebury College alumni
Alumni of Pembroke College, Oxford
Year of birth missing (living people)